John Tila Swindley (1 July 1876 – 5 August 1918) was a New Zealand rugby union player who represented the All Blacks in 1894. His position of choice was forward.

Although Jack was his birth name, Swindley was commonly known as John and in some publications, James.

Career 
Initially Swindley played for Wellington's Athletic club. He played in the Wellington provincial side for all seven games in the 1894 season. He had a further four games totalled in 1895.

Swindley made his only All Black appearance as an 18-year-old in 1894, named in an unofficial test match against the touring New South Wales side. The match was lost 8-6.

In 1896 he moved North to play for the Kuaotunu club near the Coromandel Peninsula and Whitianga where he originated from. The nearest union to him was North Auckland, but surprisingly, Swindley was selected for Auckland to play in the 1896 season which included a game against the visiting Queensland team. He played 3 games for the Auckland union.

Swindley was further selected for the All Black test match against the Queensland team but was forced to withdraw because of an injury (being replaced by Harry Frost).

He never played first-class rugby again but continued to play in the Thames area (which by then was part of the Auckland union).

He became the Thames captain and sustained the roll until 1901.

Personal and death 
Swindley first became a blacksmith, and then a miner. He left New Zealand in 1904 for Sumatra, Indonesia, to become a mining engineer. He died at the age of 42 in a mining accident in 1918. He was buried at Fort de Kock.

Swindley's father, Frederick, was part of the Armed Constabulary in the Urewera invasion. His service lasted from November 1868 to November 1872.

References

New Zealand international rugby union players
New Zealand rugby union players
1876 births
1918 deaths
People from Coromandel Peninsula
Industrial accident deaths
Rugby union forwards
Rugby union players from Waikato